The 2022 Women's U21 European Volleyball Championship was the inaugural edition of the Women's U21 European Volleyball Championship, a biennial international volleyball tournament organized by the European Volleyball Confederation (CEV). The tournament was held in Italy (host cities Cerignola and Andria) from 12 to 17 July 2022.

Qualification

Pools composition
The drawing of lots was combined with a seeding of National Federations and performed as follows:
Organiser, Italy, were seeded in Pool I
The highest ranked participating team from the CEV European Ranking, Turkey, were seeded in Pool II
Remaining 6 participating teams drawn after they were previously placed in three cups as per their position in the latest European Ranking for U19 national teams

Result
The drawing of lots was held on 1 June 2022.

Venues

Squads

Preliminary round

Pool I

|}

|}

Pool II

|}

|}

Final round

Semifinals

|}

3rd place match

|}

Final

|}

Final standing

Awards
At the conclusion of the tournament, the following players were selected as the tournament dream team.

Most Valuable Player
  Emma Cagnin
Best Setter
  Andrea Tišma
Best Outside Spikers
  Branka Tica
  Loveth Omoruyi

Best Middle Blockers
  Emma Graziani
  Ana Malešević
Best Opposite Spiker
  İpar Özay Kurt
Best Libero
  Gülce Güctekin

References

External links
Official website

Women's U21 European Volleyball Championship
Europe
Volleyball
European Volleyball Championship
European Volleyball Championship
International women's volleyball competitions hosted by Italy
Andria
Cerignola